The Venus Award is a film award in the adult film industry presented yearly in Berlin since 1997 as part of the Venus Berlin trade fair, an international erotic trade festival, on the exhibition grounds at the Funkturm.

Prizes are offered in some 30 categories and there are live strip stage shows with topless bull riding, oil wrestling and simulated live sex. The Venus Awards are unique in that directors, performers and films from the same country (Germany, France, the United States, etc.) compete for honors with other entities from that same country, while all entries also remain eligible for the "European" and "International" award categories. The International Venus Fair for 16–19 October 2003 had attendance figures of around 40,000.

From 2005 to 2009, the Eroticline Awards were presented instead, with the Venus Awards returning in 2010.

1997 Venus Awards

 Top Seller (USA) - Dragon Lady
 Top Seller (Europe) - Private Stories
 Best Film (USA) - Clockwork Orgy
 Best Film (Europe) - Le Prix dela Luxure
 Best Director (USA) - Max Hardcore
 Best Director (Europe) - Mario Salieri
 Best Actor (USA) - Valentino
 Best Actor (Europe) - Rocco Siffredi
 Best Actress (USA) - Rebecca Wild
 Best Actress (Europe) - Sarah Young
 Top Seller (Gay) - Club Paradise
 Best Director (Gay) - Jean-Daniel Cadinot
 Best Film (Gay) - Anchor Hotel
 Top Seller (Germany) - Lydia P
 Best Film (Germany) - Top Mission
 Best Camera (Germany) - Lars Gordon
 Best Series Director (Germany) - Harry S. Morgan
 Best Director (Germany) - Dino Baumberger
 Best Actor (Germany) - Steve Vincent
 Best Actress (Germany) - Kelly Trump
 Special Venus for Outstanding Input (Male) - Jean Pierre Armand
 Special Venus for Outstanding Input (Female) - Dolly Buster
 Special Venus for Lifetime Achievements - Beate Uhse

1998 Venus Awards

 Best Film - Baron of Darkness
 Best Director - Michael Ninn
 Best Actor - Conny Dax
 Best Actress - Tania Russof
 Best Newcomer, Male - Titus
 Best Newcomer, Female - Donna Vargas
 Best Camera - Kaito
 Best Series Director - Paul Rusch
 Best Video Series - Dolly Buster
 Gay Best Film - Island Guardian
 Gay Best Actor - York Powers
 Best Artwork Cover - Bezaubernde Jeannie
 Best Soft Video - Helen Meets Monique
 Best Magazine - Pirate
 Best Photographer - James Baes
 Best Soft Magazine - Penthouse
 Best TV Magazine - Peep
 Best TV Erotic Report - Dark Angel
 Venus Erotic Design Award - Schwarze Mode
 Venus Fetish Award - Peter W. Czernich
 Venus Erotic Innovation Award - Private Media Group
 Special Venus For Outstanding Input (male) - Gabriell Pontello
 Special Venus For Outstanding Input (female) - Babette Blue
 Special Venus For Lifetime Achievements - Hans Moser
 Venus '98 Sonderpreis - Princess Chantal Chevalier

1999 Venus Awards

 Best Actress (Germany) - Kelly Trump
 Starlet of the Year - Wanda Curtis
 Best Film (International) - Sex Shot

2000 Venus Awards

 Best Film - The Net
 Best American Film - Nothing to Hide 3 & 4
 Best Gay Film - Dschungel-Boys
 Best Actor (German) - Titus Steel
 Best Actor (European) - Rocco Siffredi
 Best Actress (European) - Betina Campbell
 Best Actress (German) - Gina Wild
 Best American Actress - Tina Cheri
 Best Gay Actor (German) - Hal Hart
 Best Starlet (German) - Julia Taylor
 Best Video Series - Excuse Me
 Best Television Erotica - PEEP!
 Best Director (German) - Nils Molitor
 Best Softcore Video - Tips und Tricks einer Erotik-Queen
 Best Cover - Nikita X
 Country Award: France - Marc Dorcel
 Country Award: Scandinavia - Max's
 Country Award: Benelux - Helen Duval
 Best Photography - Guido Thomasi
 Best Internet Presence - Beate Uhse AG
 Lifetime Achievement Award - Dolly Buster

2001 Venus Awards

 Best Actress (USA) - Bridgette Kerkove
 Best Director (USA) - Pierre Woodman
 Best Movie (USA) - Les Vampyres (Metro Studios)
 Best Company in America - Leisure Time Entertainment
 Best European Actor - Toni Ribas
 Best European Actress - Monique Covét
 Innovation of the Year - Berth Milton (Private Media Group)
 Country Award (Spain) - Girls of Private
 Country Award (France) - Marc Dorcel
 Country Award (Italy) - Mario Salieri
 Country Award (Scandinavia) - Beate Uhse Max's Film AB
 Best European Movie - Divina
 Best German Starlet - Tara Young
 Best German Starlet (Male) - Sachsen Paule
 Best German Actress - Kelly Trump
 Best German Actor - Zenza Raggi
 Best German Director - Harry S. Morgan
 Best German Movie - Matressen
 German Company of the Year - MMV
 Best Video Series in Germany - XXL
 Best Cover - German Beauty
 Best Soft Video - Die Teufelsinsel
 Best Erotic Photographer (Germany) - Uwe Kempen
 Newcomer Company of the Year (Germany) - Inflagranti
 Best German Gay Actor - Antoine Mallet
 Best German Gay Movie - C'est la vie
 Best DVD Product - U-Bahn Girls
 Venus Honorary Award - Teresa Orlowski
 Lifetime Achievement Award - Dirk Rothermund
 Best Web Design - www.dolly-buster.com
 Best Web Content - www.beate-uhse.de
 Internet Innovation (Presentation) - www.pelladytower.com

2002 Venus Awards

 Best DVD Product (Germany) - U-Bahn Girls II (Videorama)
 Best DVD Authoring (Germany) - New Media Group Enterprises (Goldlight)
 Best Cum-Shot Scene (Germany) - Betty Extrem - GGG - (VPS)
 Best Video Series (Germany) - Boulevard - (DBM)
 Best Video Series (Germany) - Excuse Me - (Videorama)
 Best Video Series (Germany) - Golden Series - (Tabu)
 Best Soft Film (Germany) - Manche mögen's heiß - (J.Mutzenbacher/Trimax)
 Best Soft Film (Germany) - Venus Girls - (VNM)
 Best Soft Series (Germany) - Better Sex Line - (Orion)
 Best Soft Series (Germany) - Cover Girls - (VNM)
 Best Cover (Germany) - Crossroads - (Videorama)
 Best Product Campaign (Germany) - Gladiator - (Private Media Group)
 Best Product Campaign (Germany) - Mandy Mystery Line - (Orion)
 Best Director (Germany) - Nils Molitor
 Best Director (Germany) - Horst Billian
 Best Director (Germany) - Ferdi Hillmann
 Best Film (Germany) - Faust - (Goldlight)
 Best Film (Germany) - Hart & Herzlich - (Videorama)
 Best Film (Germany) - Sexhexen - (MMV)
 Best New Actress (Germany) - Kyra
 Best New Actress (Germany) - Tyra Misoux
 Best New Actress (Germany) - CoCo Brown
 Best New Company (Europe) - Hustler Germany
 Special Award (Eastern Europe) - Kovi
 Special Award (Scandinavia) - Max's Sweden
 Special Award (France) - Marc Dorcel
 Best Movie (Europe) - Gladiator - (Private Media Group)
 Best Movie (Europe) - Faust - (Goldlight)
 Best Director (Europe) - Mario Salieri
 Best Director (Europe) - Antonio Adamo
 Best Actor (Europe) - Toni Ribas
 Best Actress (Eastern Europe) - Monique Covét
 Best Actress (Eastern Europe) - Rita Faltoyano
 Best Gay Film - Russian Village Boys - (Man's Best)
 Best Gay Director - Jean-Daniel Cadinot
 Best Actress (USA) - Tera Patrick
 Best Actress (USA) - Jodie Moore
 Best Movie (USA) - Perfect - (Private Media Group)
 Best Movie (USA) - Taboo 2001 - (Touch Video)
 Best Director (USA) - Andrew Blake
 Best Director (USA) - Pierre Woodman
 Best Video Series (International) - Barely Legal - (Hustler Video)
 Best Internet Presentation - www.privatespeed.com
 Product Innovation Bio Glide - Joydivision
 Innovation of the Year - Private-PDA
 Innovation of the Year - ErotikCinema.de (Musketier)
 Company of the Year (Germany) - Goldlight
 Company of the Year (Germany) - MMV
 Company of the Year (Germany) - Videorama
 Best Actor (Germany) - Horst Baron
 Best Actor (Germany) - Titus
 Best Actor (Germany) - Claudio Meloni
 Best Actress (Germany) - Isabel Golden
 Best Actress (Germany) - Anja Juliette Laval
 Best Actress (Germany) - Mandy Mystery
 Lifetime Achievement Award (Germany) - Moli

2003 Venus Awards

 Best Actor (Europe) - Rocco Siffredi
 Best Actress (Hungary) - Michelle Wild
 Best Actress (Europe) - Julia Taylor
 Best Soft Movie Germany - Fesselnde Knotenkunst Aus Fernost (Orion)
 Best Film - Benelux Wasteland (Bizarre Spielchen/Magmafilm)
 Best Film (Spain) - The Fetish Garden
 Best Film (France) - Melanie (La Jouisseuse/VMD)
 Best Film (Scandinavia) - Pink Prison
 Best Film (USA) - Space Nuts (Wicked Pictures)
 Best Film (Hungary) - The Garden of Seduction
 Best Film (Italy) - La Dolce Vita
 Best Film (Germany) - Die 8.Sünde (The 8th Sin - Magmafilm)
 Best Film (Europe) - Cleopatra
 Best Video Series (International) - Balls Deep (Anabolic)
 Best Video Series (Germany) - Black Hammer (VNM By VPS)
 Best Gay Movie (International) - French Erection (Ikarus Film)
 Best Erotic PC Game - Casablanca 1942 (Red Fire Software/VPS)
 Best Erotic Stage Show - Tammy's Erotic Show
 Best Cover (Germany) - Fesselnde Knotenkunst Aus Fernost (Orion)
 Best Director (France) - Alain Payet
 Best Director (Italy) - Mario Salieri
 Best Gay Director (International) - Jean-Daniel Cadinot
 Best Erotic Magazine (Germany) - Coupe
 Best Internet Presence - pelladytower.com
 Best Erotic Idea - Poppp-Stars/Beate Uhse
 Best DVD Product (Germany) - Triebige Swinger
 Best DVD Product (Europe) - La Dolce Vita
 Distribution Company Of The Year Germany - Orion
 Company of the Year - MMV (Multi Media Verlag)
 Innovation of the Year - Dolly Buster at Vodafone-live
 Special Product Award - Nature Skin Toys/Orion
 Special Jury Awards - Marc Anthony (Private), www.private.com & Dolly Buster
 Special Honorary Awards - Gerd Wasmund (alias Mike Hunter) & Harry S. Morgan
 Best New Starlet (USA) - Sunrise Adams (Vivid)
 Best Actor (USA) - Lexington Steele (VNM)
 Best New Starlet (Hungary) - Maya Gold (Luxx Video)
 Best Director (Hungary) - Don Sigfredo (DBM)
 Best Director (Scandinavia) - Nike Beck (Tabu)
 Best Actress (Scandinavia) - Tanya Hansen (Tabu)
 Best New Starlet (Europe) - Laura Angel
 Best Actress (France) - Mélanie Coste (VMD)
 Best New Starlet (Germany) - Sharon Da Vale (Inflagranti)
 Best Director (Germany) - Nils Molitor (Magmafilm)
 Best Director (Europe) - Kovi (Luxx Video)
 Best Actor (Germany) - Conny Dax (Magmafilm)
 Best Actress (Germany) - Denise La Bouche (MMV)

2004 Venus Awards

 Best Cover (Germany) - Der Club des anspruchsvollen Herrn (Videorama)
 Best Newcomer Label (Germany) - Bad Ass (Playhouse)
 Best Newcomer Company (Germany) - EVS
 Best Gay Director (International) - Marcel Bruckmann
 Best Gay Movie (International) - Sex Around the Clock (S.E.V.P.)
 Print Reports Italy, UK and Germany (Jury-Award) - Hot News/ETO/Medien E-Line
 Special Product Campaign Germany (Jury-Award) - Testosteron Power-Pack No.1 (No Limit)
 Special Marketing Campaign Germany (Jury-Award) - www.missbusty.de (VNM)
 Special Video Production (Jury-Award) - German Goo Girls (John Thompson Productions)
 Special Video Series (Jury-Award) - Arschparade (MMV)
 TOP Erotic TV Show (Jury-Award) - Lust Pur Mit Conny Dax (Beate Uhse TV)
 Special Internet Site (Jury-Award) - www.ueber18.de
 Special Eastern Europe Award (Jury-Award) - Ference Hopka
 Special German Company (Jury-Award) - Muschi Video
 Successful Video Series Germany (Jury-Award) - Mutzenbacher (Herzog Video)
 Best DVD Product (Germany) - Millionaire (Private Media Group)
 Best Camera (Germany) - Nils Molitor
 Best Video Series (Germany) - H D S S S G (DBM)
 Best Soft Movie (Germany) - Bettenwechsel in Dänemark (Orion Versand)
 Best Actress (Hungary) - Nikky Blond
 Best Gonzo Movie/Series (International) - Apprentass (Playhouse)
 Best B2C Website (International) - www.FunDorado.com  (Orion Versand)
 Best Internet Presence (International) - www.DejanProduction.de
 Best Director (Italy) - Mario Salieri - Penocchio (Goldlight)
 Best New Starlet Female (France) - Priscila Sol
 Special Award Benelux (Jury-Award) - SEXY (Shots Video)
 Best Company Spain (Jury-Award) - IFG
 Special Europe Video Series (Jury-Award) - Anabolic (Anabolic Video)
 International Actress (Jury-Award) - Katja Kassin
 Best Movie (USA) - Compulsion (Elegant Angel)
 Best Director (USA) - Robby D. - Jack's Playground (Digital Playground)
 Best Movie (France) - Parfum du Desir (Video Marc Dorcel)
 Best Movie (Italy) - Life (Pink O)
 Best New Starlet Female (Europe) - Cristina Bella
 Best Actor (Europe) - Nacho Vidal
 Best Video Series (Europe) - Rocco's Sexy Girls (MMV)
 Best Website (Germany) - www.dolly-buster.de (DBM)
 Distribution Company of the Year (Germany) - VPS Film-Entertainment
 Best Director (Germany) - Harry S. Morgan
 Best Actor (Germany) - Markus Waxenegger
 Best New Starlet Female (Germany) - Janine LaTeen
 Best New Starlet Female (Germany) - Vivian Schmitt
 Top Toy Product Line (Jury-Award) - Silvia Saint Toy Line (Orion)
 A.o.P. (Jury-Award) - Steve Holmes
 Successful Video Series Europe (Jury-Award) - Lexington (VNM)
 Best Actress (USA) - Jesse Jane
 Company of the Year (Germany) - Mulit Media Verlag
 Best Movie (Germany) - Penocchio (Goldlight)
 Best Actress (Germany) - Tyra Misoux
 Best Movie (Europe) - Millionaire (Private Media Group)
 Best Director (Europe) - Kovi
 Best Actress (Europe) - Katsuni
 Special Actress (Jury-Award) - Monique Covét
 Honorary Award (International) - Berth Milton

2010 Venus Awards

 Best Magazine (Germany) - Happy Weekend
 Best Erotic Retail Store (Germany) - Ego Erotikfachmarkt
 Best Redlight Portal (Germany) - Berlinintim.de
 Best European Erotic Online Offer (Europe) - MoMo-net.com
 Best Web Innovation (International) - Amateurflatrate.com (DBM)
 Best Adult TV Channel (Germany) - Hustler TV Deutschland
 Best VoD Offer (Germany) - Erotic Lounge
 Best Webcam Girl (International) - Gina (goldmodels.de/livestrip.com)
 Best Director (International) - Allegro Swing
 Best Newcomer Company (International) - Parliament/CZ
 Best Manga Series (International) - Trimax
 Best Video Series (Germany) - Magma Swing (Magmafilm)
 Best Newcomer (Europe) - Vittoria Risi
 Best Actress (Europe) - Roberta Gemma
 Erotic Fetish Lifestyle Magazine - PO Magazin
 Best Mobile Entertainment Company - Pinksim! (Pink Adventure AG)
 Feature Movie with Celebrity Star (Special Jury Award) - Cindy in Heat (Paradise)
 Best Online Distribution System (Germany) - Partnercash
 Best Internet Portal (Germany) - Fundorado.de
 Best Website Amateur (Germany) - MyDirtyHobby.com
 Best Movie (Germany) - Die Viper (Goldlight)
 Best Movie (Europe) - Lethal Body (ATV Group)
 Special Jury Award - Sofia Gucci
 Best Video Series (Europe) - Russian Institute (Marc Dorcel)
 Best Video Series (International) - Titus on Tour (Erotic Planet)
 Best Amateur Actress (Germany) - Sexy Cora
 Best Newcomer (International) - Jade Laroche
 Best Actress (International) - Kayden Kross
 Best Toy Series (International) - Sexy Cora Toys (Orion)
 Best VoD Offer (Europe) - DORCEL TVoD and SVoD platform
 Best HD Offer (International) - Erotic Lounge
 Fair Management (Special Jury Award) - X-Show Moskau
 Internet Business (Special Jury Award) - EUROWEBTAINMENT (Gunnar Steger)
 Innovation Mobile (Special Jury Award) - My Dirty Mobile.de
 Best VoD Offer (International) - Sapphire Media International B.V.
 Best Adult TV Channel (Europe) - Dorcel TV
 Best Adult TV Channel (International) - Hustler TV
 Video Provider of the Year (Germany) - EROTIC PLANET
 Best Movie (International) - Body Heat (Digital Playground)
 Best Actress (Germany) - Vivian Schmitt
 Best HD TV Channel - Penthouse HD
 European Film and Video Cooperation (Special Jury Award) - GOLDLIGHT
 Movie and Film (Special Jury Award) -  This Ain't Avatar XXX (Hustler Video)
 Movie-Internet Innovation (Special Jury Award) - Saboom (Partnercash)
 Company of the Year - Penthouse
 Movie Innovation of the Year - Dorcel 3D (Marc Dorcel)
 Business Woman of the Year - Nicole Kleinhenz

2011 Venus Awards

 Best Erotic Mobile Application - Bleepersex
 Best Erotic Designer - Adult Profi
 Special Erotic Performer - Pussykate
 Best DVD Online Erotic Store/Blu-ray - dvderotik.com
 Best Payment System - www.payment-network.com
 Best Director - Ettore Buchi
 Most Innovative Amateur Projects - Aische Pervers
 Best New Erotic Affiliate Program - www.immocash.de
 Best New Amateur DVD Series - MyDirtyHobby
 Best Adult TV Channel - Hustler TV Germany
 Best Fetish Website - www.clips4sale.com
 Best Website Commercial - www.fundorado.com
 Best VoD Offer - Sapphire Media International B.V.
 Best Erotic Lifestyle Magazine - Penthouse Germany
 Best Newcomer Actress - Anna Polina
 Best Male Actor - Pornofighter Long John
 Best Newcomer Amateur Girl - Sweet-Selina
 Best Redlight Portal - www.berlinintim.de
 Best Mobile Website - www.clipmobile.de
 Best Toy Series International - Love to Love by Lovely Planet
 Best Feature Movie - 007 Golden Ass (Paradise Film Entertainment)
 Best Adult Trade Magazine - Sign EUROPE
 Best Erotic Entertainment Duo - Maria Mia & Sharon da Vale
 Best HD Channel - Hustler TV
 Best Amateur DVD Series - Sexy Cora Amateurstars
 Best New Adult Company - Magik View Entertainment
 Best Erotic Affiliate Program - www.partnercash.com
 Outstanding Acting Progress - Lena Nitro
 Best Erotic TV Format - Babestand Productions
 Most Ambitious High-End Productions - Mission Ass Possible/Smuggling Sexpedition (Private Media Group)
 Best Amateur Girl - Lea4You
 Best Design Innovation - Je Joue
 Best VoD Offer - www.erotic-lounge.com
 Best Innovation Internet - Saboom.com
 Best Website Amateur - MyDirtyHobby.com
 Best Female Actress - Roberta Gemma
 International Successful Video Company - Goldlight
 Best Adult TV Channel - Hustler TV
 Best TV Presentation by Erotic Star - Stella Styles
 Best Video Series - Soulbrettes Services (Marc Dorcel)
 Business Woman of the Year - Kelly Holland
 Best Blockbuster of the Year - Mission Ass Possible (Private Media Group)

2012 Venus Awards

 Best Actor - Markus Waxxenegger
 Best Newcomer (female) - Xania Wet
 Best Actress - Lena Nitro
 Best Director - John Thompson
 Best Amateur Girl - Aische Pervers
 Best Amateur Website - Julia Herz
 Best Innovation - Pornogutschein.com
 Best Internet Site - Fundorado.de
 Best Toy Series - FunFactory
 Best Dessous/Fashion Series - Hustler Apparel
 Best Film - Starportrait Maria Mia & Sharon da Vale
 Best Print Magazine - Penthouse
 Best Erotic TV Channel - Babestation24.de
 Best BDSM Model - Yvette Costeau
 Lifetime Achievement (female) - Biggi Bardot
 Erotic TV Format - Visit.X.TV
 All Over Internet - Erovous
 New Webstar Of The Year - Sweet-Sophie
 Featured Film for Goodbye Marilyn (Actress) - Julie Hunter
 Featured Film for Goodbye Marilyn (Actor) - Markus Waxxenegger
 Featured Film for Goodbye Marilyn (Director) - Allegro Swing
 Performance in all Areas of the German Adult Industry - Pornfighter Long John
 Crossover Star - Roberta Gemma
 Erotic Model of the Year - Micaela Schaefer
 Lifetime Achievement (male) - Ron Jeremy

2013 Venus Awards

 Best Actress - Lena Nitro
 Best Actress International - Christy Mack
 Best TV-Act - Julie Hunter
 Best Female Newcomer - Lexy Roxx
 Best Actor - Chris Hilton
 Best Label - Magmafilm
 Best Director - Tim Grenzwert
 Best Movie - Oktober Sexfest (Private Media Group)
 Best Producer - Wolfgang Embacher
 Best MILF - Sexy Susi
 Best Amateurgirl - Aische Pervers
 Best Webpage - FunDorado.com
 Best Erotic-Community - Joyclub.de
 Best Gonzo Label - Cruel Media
 Best Erotic-Guide - BERLINintim/BERLINintim-Club
 Best New Product - Penomet
 Best Live Cam Site International - LiveJasmin
 Best Licensed Toy Collection - Penthouse Pet Cyberskin Collection
 Best Magazine - Penthouse
 Best New Channel Launch - Penthouse Black
 Best Toy Design - OVO
 Best Innovation - Chathouse 3D thriXXX
 Best New Toyline - Mystim
 Jury Award - Pipedream
 Jury Award - Aileen Taylor
 Jury Award - Manuel Stallion
 Jury Award - Texas Patti

2014 Venus Awards

 Best E-Stim Toyline - Mystim
 Best Website - Fundorado.de
 Best Amateur Community - Big7.de
 Best Innovation - Spankrags
 Best Erotic Offer - Erotic Lounge
 Bestselling New Toyline - Mystim
 Best Producer - John Thompson
 Best Film - Rollergirl
 Best Fetish - Zonah
 Best MILF - Lilly Ladina
 Best Actor - Jean Pallett
 Best Live Performance Female - Kitty Core
 Best Amateur Girl - RoxxyX
 Best Newcomer - Natalie Hot
 Best Actress National - Julie Hunter
 Best Actress International - Bonnie Rotten
 Best Asian Performer - PussyKat
 Best Newcomer Label - Chris Hilton Entertainment
 Jury-Award: Best Series Hard and Soft - CamGirlFarm
 Jury-Award: Best German Pay Per View Offer - Blue Movie
 Jury-Award: Best Penis Pump - Penomet (UPL Distribution GmbH)
 Jury-Award: Best Porn Career - Salma de Nora
 Jury-Award: Best Marketing Campaign - "Full on Love" (Fun Factory)
 Jury-Award: Best Cross-Media Entertainment - Fundorado.tv
 Jury-Award: Best Erotic Model - Micaela Schaefer
 Jury-Award: Lifetime Achievement - Jesse Jane
 Jury-Award: Shootingstar - Julia Pink
 Jury-Award: Best TV Report - René on Tour (USA Special/Die René Schwuchow Show)
 Jury-Award: Best Interactive Product - Penthouse Cyberskin Reality Girls

2015 Venus Awards

 Best Manufacturer - Mystim
 Best Website - Fundorado.com
 Best Amateur Community - Big7
 Best Director - Tim Grenzwert
 Best Sexparty - Erlebniswohnung
 Best Video-on-Demand Portal - erotic-lounge.com
 Best E-Stim Line - Mystim
 Most Innovative Toy (Jury Award) - Topco Sales Twerking Butt
 Best Series Soft and Hard (Jury Award) - Barcelona Heat & London Love Affairs (Beate-Uhse.TV/Blue Movie/Private)
 Gang Bang Queen (Jury Award) - Samy Saint
 Best Network of Paysites (Jury Award) - PornDoe Premium
 Best Porn Couple (Jury Award) - Mick Blue & Anikka Albrite
 Innovative Product (Jury Award) - Erotische-Hypnose.com
 Best Erotic Actress International (Jury Award) - 
 Best European Erotic Magazine (Jury Award) - Penthouse
 Best Pornstar (Jury Award) - Lullu Gun
 Best Series Moderation - Paula Rowe (Rowe – Sextipps vom Profi)
 Best Amateur Girl - Nina Devil
 Best MILF - Julia Pink
 Best Fetish Actor - Cobie
 Best Actor - Diether von Stein
 Best Webcamgirl - Meli Deluxe
 Best New Actress - Natalie Hot
 Fan Award - Kitty Monroe
 Best Actress - Texas Patti

2017 Venus Awards

 Best online VoD platform - Beate Uhse Movie
 Best VR site - Realitylovers.com
 Best series - Erotic Lounge Edition
 Best international label - Private
 Best Manufacturer 2017 - Mystim
 Best Network of Paysites (Jury Award) - PornDoe Premium
 Best VR Actor (Jury Award) - Patty Michova
 Best German production soft / hard (Jury award) - Sexpension Hüttenzauber
 Most Innovative Influencer Platform (Jury Award) - FANCentro
 Best domina studio Germany - Domina Studio & VIP Lounge Elegance
 Best BDSM Production - Badtime Stories, Smorlow
 Best newcomer porn film production - MariskaX
 Best cameraman - Ronny Rosetti
 Best domina studio in Europe - Casa Casal
 Best Actor - Jason Steel
 Best senior actor - Big George
 Best MILF - Dirty Tina
 Best webcam girl - RoxxyX
 Best actress - Anny Aurora
 Best Actress in Europe - Lena Nitro
 Best Actress International - Texas Patti

2018 Venus Awards 

 Best amateur girl - Lucy Cat
 Best Milf International - Texas Patti
 Best Actress - Little Caprice
 Best Virtual Reality Actress - Texas Patti
 Best international show girl - Pussykat
 Best shooting star 2018 - Vika Viktoria
 Best Actress in South America - Luna Corazon
 Best Actor - Marcello Bravo
 Lifetime Achievement - Stormy Daniels
 Best Adult Coin - Proncoin
 Best New Website - Erotik.com
 Best live cam community - Visit-X.net
 Best OTT offer in Germany - Sky Q: The 18+ app
 Best Virtual Reality website - RealityLovers.com
 Best VOD portal - Erotic-lounge.com
 Best international series - "XConfessions" by Erika Lust
 Best amateur community - MyDirtyHobby
 Best production company - Big George Production
 Best Dominastudio Europe - bizarre paradise
 Best TV series soft (Jury Award) - Sexy Alm 1 to 4
 Best Manufacturer 2018 (Jury Award) - Mystim
 Best Retailer Germany 2018 (Jury Award) - 18+ GmbH
 Best Newcomer Marketing & Management Agency (Jury Award) - Pornagent
 Best innovative product (Jury award) - BANGJUICE

2019 Venus Awards 

 Best VOD Offer (Germany) - Erotic-Lounge
 Best German Movie - "Höhenrausch"
 Best Amateur Community - MyDirtyHobby
 Best Cam Site - Bongacams
 Best Innovation Product - Silk'n
 Best VR Actress - Eveline Dellai
 Best Cam Girl - Tamara Milano
 Best Actor - Marcello Bravo
 Best MILF - Texas Patti
 Newcomer Shootingstar 2019 - Fiona Fuchs
 Best Amateur Girl - Hanna Secret
 Best Series - German Scout
 Best Actress Europe - Julia de Lucia
 Best Actress International - Little Caprice
 Most Creative Venus Reporter - Aaron Troschke
 Best Erotic Product - Erotische-Hypnose
 Best Erotic Flavour - Bang Juice
 Best Newcomer Marketing and Management Agency - Porn Agent
 Lifetime Award - Captain John

See also
 AVN Award
 Hot d'Or

References

External links

 
 
 List of 2003 Venus Award winners
 "Private and Americans Win Big at Venus Fair" - 2003 Award winners - October 22, 2003
 2004 Nominations
 Recent Award winners list
 Venus Awards, since 1997 - the "Oscars of the adult industry" and "the world's largest erotic trade fair"
 Venus Awards - "a kind of Porn Oscar"

Pornographic film awards
Venus (mythology)
German pornography